Alberto Nocerino (born 20 December 1975, in Torre Annunziata, Province of Naples) is an Italian football defender who currently plays for S.S. Cavese 1919.

Appearances on Italian Series 

Serie B : 55 Apps, 2 Goals

Serie C1 : 213 Apps, 5 Goals

Serie C2 : 98 Apps, 2 Goals

Total : 366 Apps, 9 Goals

External links
http://aic.football.it/scheda/1949/nocerino-alberto.htm

1975 births
Living people
People from Torre Annunziata
Italian footballers
Association football defenders
U.S. Savoia 1908 players
Benevento Calcio players
F.C. Crotone players
Calcio Lecco 1912 players
Cavese 1919 players
Sportspeople from the Province of Naples
Footballers from Campania